Electricity generation is the process of generating electric power from sources of primary energy. For utilities in the electric power industry, it is the stage prior to its delivery (transmission, distribution, etc.) to end users or its storage (using, for example, the pumped-storage method).

Electricity is not freely available in nature, so it must be "produced" (that is, transforming other forms of energy to electricity). Production is carried out in power stations (also called "power plants"). Electricity is most often generated at a power plant by electromechanical generators, primarily driven by heat engines fueled by combustion or nuclear fission but also by other means such as the kinetic energy of flowing water and wind. Other energy sources include solar photovoltaics and geothermal power. There are also exotic and speculative methods to recover energy, such as proposed fusion reactor designs which aim to directly extract energy from intense magnetic fields generated by fast-moving charged particles generated by the fusion reaction (see magnetohydrodynamics). 

Phasing out coal-fired power stations and eventually gas-fired power stations, or, if practical, capturing their greenhouse gas emissions, is an important part of the energy transformation required to limit climate change. Vastly more solar power and wind power is forecast to be required, with electricity demand increasing strongly with further electrification of transport, homes and industry.

History 

The fundamental principles of electricity generation were discovered in the 1820s and early 1830s by British scientist Michael Faraday. His method, still used today, is for electricity to be generated by the movement of a loop of wire, or Faraday disc, between the poles of a magnet. Central power stations became economically practical with the development of alternating current (AC) power transmission, using power transformers to transmit power at high voltage and with low loss.

Commercial electricity production started with the coupling of the dynamo to the hydraulic turbine. The mechanical production of electric power began the Second Industrial Revolution and made possible several inventions using electricity, with the major contributors being Thomas Alva Edison and Nikola Tesla. Previously the only way to produce electricity was by chemical reactions or using battery cells, and the only practical use of electricity was for the telegraph.

Electricity generation at central power stations started in 1882, when a steam engine driving a dynamo at Pearl Street Station produced a DC current that powered public lighting on Pearl Street, New York. The new technology was quickly adopted by many cities around the world, which adapted their gas-fueled street lights to electric power. Soon after electric lights would be used in public buildings, in businesses, and to power public transport, such as trams and trains.

The first power plants used water power or coal. Today a variety of energy sources are used, such as coal, nuclear, natural gas, hydroelectric, wind, and oil, as well as solar energy, tidal power, and geothermal sources.

In the 1880s the popularity of electricity grew massively with the introduction of the Incandescent light bulb. Although there are 22 recognised inventors of the light bulb prior to Joseph Swan and Thomas Edison, Edison and Swan's invention became by far the most successful and popular of all. During the early years of the 19th century, massive jumps in electrical sciences were made. And by the later 19th century the advancement of electrical technology and engineering led to electricity being part of everyday life. With the introduction of many electrical inventions and their implementation into everyday life, the demand for electricity within homes grew dramatically. With this increase in demand, the potential for profit was seen by many entrepreneurs who began investing into electrical systems to eventually create the first electricity public utilities. This process in history is often described as electrification.

The earliest distribution of electricity came from companies operating independently of one another. A consumer would purchase electricity from a producer, and the producer would distribute it through their own power grid. As technology improved so did the productivity and efficiency of its generation. Inventions such as the steam turbine had a massive impact on the efficiency of electrical generation but also the economics of generation as well. This conversion of heat energy into mechanical work was similar to that of steam engines, however at a significantly larger scale and far more productively. The improvements of these large-scale generation plants were critical to the process of centralised generation as they would become vital to the entire power system that we now use today. 

Throughout the middle of the 20th century many utilities began merging their distribution networks due to economic and efficiency benefits. Along with the invention of long-distance power transmission, the coordination of power plants began to form. This system was then secured by regional system operators to ensure stability and reliability. The electrification of homes began in Northern Europe and in the Northern America in the 1920s in large cities and urban areas. It wasn't until the 1930s that rural areas saw the large-scale establishment of electrification.

Methods of generation 

Several fundamental methods exist to convert other forms of energy into electrical energy. Utility-scale generation is achieved by rotating electric generators or by photovoltaic systems. A small proportion of electric power distributed by utilities is provided by batteries. Other forms of electricity generation used in niche applications include the triboelectric effect, the piezoelectric effect, the thermoelectric effect, and betavoltaics.

Generators 

Electric generators transform kinetic energy into electricity. This is the most used form for generating electricity and is based on Faraday's law. It can be seen experimentally by rotating a magnet within closed loops of conducting material (e.g. copper wire). Almost all commercial electrical generation is done using electromagnetic induction, in which mechanical energy forces a generator to rotate.

Electrochemistry 

Electrochemistry is the direct transformation of chemical energy into electricity, as in a battery. Electrochemical electricity generation is important in portable and mobile applications. Currently, most electrochemical power comes from batteries. Primary cells, such as the common zinc–carbon batteries, act as power sources directly, but secondary cells (i.e. rechargeable batteries) are used for storage systems rather than primary generation systems. Open electrochemical systems, known as fuel cells, can be used to extract power either from natural fuels or from synthesized fuels. Osmotic power is a possibility at places where salt and fresh water merge.

Photovoltaic effect 
The photovoltaic effect is the transformation of light into electrical energy, as in solar cells. Photovoltaic panels convert sunlight directly to DC electricity. Power inverters can then convert that to AC electricity if needed. Although sunlight is free and abundant, solar power electricity is still usually more expensive to produce than large-scale mechanically generated power due to the cost of the panels. Low-efficiency silicon solar cells have been decreasing in cost and multijunction cells with close to 30% conversion efficiency are now commercially available. Over 40% efficiency has been demonstrated in experimental systems. Until recently, photovoltaics were most commonly used in remote sites where there is no access to a commercial power grid, or as a supplemental electricity source for individual homes and businesses. Recent advances in manufacturing efficiency and photovoltaic technology, combined with subsidies driven by environmental concerns, have dramatically accelerated the deployment of solar panels. Installed capacity is growing by around 20% per year led by increases in Germany, Japan, United States, China, and India.

Economics 

The selection of electricity production modes and their economic viability varies in accordance with demand and region. The economics vary considerably around the world, resulting in widespread residential selling prices. Hydroelectric plants, nuclear power plants, thermal power plants and renewable sources have their own pros and cons, and selection is based upon the local power requirement and the fluctuations in demand. All power grids have varying loads on them but the daily minimum is the base load, often supplied by plants which run continuously. Nuclear, coal, oil, gas and some hydro plants can supply base load. If well construction costs for natural gas are below $10 per MWh, generating electricity from natural gas is cheaper than generating power by burning coal.

Nuclear power plants can produce a huge amount of power from a single unit. However, nuclear disasters have raised concerns over the safety of nuclear power, and the capital cost of nuclear plants is very high.
Hydroelectric power plants are located in areas where the potential energy from falling water can be harnessed for moving turbines and the generation of power. It may not be an economically viable single source of production where the ability to store the flow of water is limited and the load varies too much during the annual production cycle.

Generating equipment

Electric generators were known in simple forms from the discovery of electromagnetic induction in the 1830s. In general, some form of prime mover such as an engine or the turbines described above, drives a rotating magnetic field past stationary coils of wire thereby turning mechanical energy into electricity. The only commercial scale electricity production that does not employ a generator is solar PV.

Turbines 

Almost all commercial electrical power on Earth is generated with a turbine, driven by wind, water, steam or burning gas. The turbine drives a generator, thus transforming its mechanical energy into electrical energy by electromagnetic induction. There are many different methods of developing mechanical energy, including heat engines, hydro, wind and tidal power. Most electric generation is driven by heat engines. The combustion of fossil fuels supplies most of the energy to these engines, with a significant fraction from nuclear fission and some from renewable sources. The modern steam turbine (invented by Sir Charles Parsons in 1884) currently generates about 80% of the electric power in the world using a variety of heat sources. Turbine types include:
 Steam 
 Water is boiled by coal burned in a thermal power plant. About 41% of all electricity is generated this way.
 Nuclear fission heat created in a nuclear reactor creates steam. Less than 15% of electricity is generated this way.
 Renewable energy. The steam is generated by biomass, solar thermal energy, or geothermal power.
 Natural gas: turbines are driven directly by gases produced by combustion. Combined cycle are driven by both steam and natural gas. They generate power by burning natural gas in a gas turbine and use residual heat to generate steam. At least 20% of the world's electricity is generated by natural gas.
Water Energy is captured by a water turbine from the movement of water - from falling water, the rise and fall of tides or ocean thermal currents (see ocean thermal energy conversion). Currently, hydroelectric plants provide approximately 16% of the world's electricity.
The windmill was a very early wind turbine. In 2018 around 5% of the world's electricity was produced from wind
Turbines can also use other heat-transfer liquids than steam. Supercritical carbon dioxide based cycles  can provide higher conversion efficiency due to faster heat exchange, higher energy density and simpler power cycle infrastructure. Supercritical carbon dioxide blends, that are currently in development, can further increase efficiency by optimizing its critical pressure and temperature points.

Although turbines are most common in commercial power generation, smaller generators can be powered by gasoline or diesel engines. These may used for backup generation or as a prime source of power within isolated villages.

Production 

Total worldwide gross production of electricity in 2016 was 25 082 TWh. Sources of electricity were coal and peat 38.3%, natural gas 23.1%, hydroelectric 16.6%, nuclear power 10.4%, oil 3.7%, solar/wind/geothermal/tidal/other 5.6%, biomass and waste 2.3%.

In 2021, Wind and solar generated electricity reached 10% of globally produced electricity. Clean sources (Solar and wind and other) generated 38% of the world's electricity.

Historical results of production of electricity

Production by country 

The United States has long been the largest producer and consumer of electricity, with a global share in 2005 of at least 25%, followed by China, Japan, Russia, and India. In 2011, China overtook the United States to become the largest producer of electricity.

Environmental concerns 

Variations between countries generating electrical power affect concerns about the environment. In France only 10% of electricity is generated from fossil fuels, the US is higher at 70% and China is at 80%. The cleanliness of electricity depends on its source. Methane leaks (from natural gas to fuel gas-fired power plants) and carbon dioxide emissions from fossil fuel-based electricity generation account for a significant portion of world greenhouse gas emissions.  In the United States, fossil fuel combustion for electric power generation is responsible for 65% of all emissions of sulfur dioxide, the main component of acid rain. Electricity generation is the fourth highest combined source of NOx, carbon monoxide, and particulate matter in the US.

According to the International Energy Agency (IEA), low-carbon electricity generation needs to account for 85% of global electrical output by 2040 in order to ward off the worst effects of climate change. Like other organizations including the Energy Impact Center (EIC) and the United Nations Economic Commission for Europe (UNECE), the IEA has called for the expansion of nuclear and renewable energy to meet that objective. Some, like EIC founder Bret Kugelmass, believe that nuclear power is the primary method for decarbonizing electricity generation because it can also power direct air capture that removes existing carbon emissions from the atmosphere. Nuclear power plants can also create district heating and desalination projects, limiting carbon emissions and the need for expanded electrical output.

A fundamental issue regarding centralised generation and the current electrical generation methods in use today is the significant negative environmental effects that many of the generation processes have. Processes such as coal and gas not only release carbon dioxide as they combust, but their extraction from the ground also impacts the environment. Open pit coal mines use large areas of land to extract coal and limit the potential for productive land use after the excavation. Natural gas extraction releases large amounts of methane into the atmosphere when extracted from the ground greatly increase global greenhouse gases. Although nuclear power plants do not release carbon dioxide through electricity generation, there are significant risks associated with nuclear waste and safety concerns associated with the use of nuclear sources. This fear of nuclear power stems from large-scale nuclear catastrophes such as the Chernobyl Disaster and the Fukushima Daiichi nuclear disaster. Both tragedies led to significant casualties and the radioactive contamination of large areas.

Per unit of electricity generated coal and gas-fired power life-cycle greenhouse gas emissions are almost always at least ten times that of other generation methods.

Centralised and distributed generation
Centralised generation is electricity generation by large-scale centralised facilities, sent through transmission lines to consumers. These facilities are usually located far away from consumers and distribute the electricity through high voltage transmission lines to a substation, where it is then distributed to consumers; the basic concept being that multi-megawatt or gigawatt scale large stations create electricity for a large number of people. The vast majority of electricity used is created from centralised generation. Most centralised power generation comes from large power plants run by fossil fuels such as coal or natural gas, though nuclear or large hydroelectricity plants are also commonly used.   
Centralised generation is fundamentally the opposite of distributed generation. Distributed generation is the small-scale generation of electricity to smaller groups of consumers. This can also include independently producing electricity by either solar or wind power. In recent years distributed generation as has seen a spark in popularity due to its propensity to use renewable energy generation methods such as rooftop solar.

Technologies
Centralised energy sources are large power plants that produce huge amounts of electricity to a large number of consumers. Most power plants used in centralised generation are thermal power plants meaning that they use a fuel to heat steam to produce a pressurised gas which in turn spins a turbine and generates electricity.  This is the traditional way of producing energy. This process relies on several forms of technology to produce widespread electricity, these being natural coal, gas and nuclear forms of thermal generation. More recently solar and wind have become large scale.

Solar

Wind

Coal

Natural gas
Natural gas is ignited to create pressurised gas which is used to spin turbines to generate electricity. Natural gas plants use a gas turbine where natural gas is added along with oxygen which in turn combusts and expands through the turbine to force a generator to spin. 

Natural gas power plants are more efficient than coal power generation, they however contribute to climate change but not as highly as coal generation. Not only do they produce carbon dioxide from the ignition of natural gas, but also the extraction of gas when mined releases a significant amount of methane into the atmosphere.

Nuclear
Nuclear power plants create electricity through steam turbines where the heat input is from the process of nuclear fission. Currently, nuclear power produces 11% of all electricity in the world. Most nuclear reactors use uranium as a source of fuel. In a process called nuclear fission, energy, in the form of heat, is released when nuclear atoms are split. Electricity is created through the use of a nuclear reactor where heat produced by nuclear fission is used to produce steam which in turn spins turbines and powers the generators. Although there are several types of nuclear reactors, all fundamentally use this process.

Normal emissions due to nuclear power plants are primarily waste heat and radioactive spent fuel. In a reactor accident, significant amounts of radioisotopes can be released to the environment, posing a long term hazard to life. This hazard has been a continuing concern of environmentalists.  Accidents such as the Three Mile Island accident, Chernobyl disaster and the Fukushima nuclear disaster illustrate this problem.

See also

 Cogeneration: the use of a heat engine or power station to generate electricity and useful heat at the same time.
 Cost of electricity by source
 Diesel generator
 Electric generator
 Engine-generator
 Electric power transmission
 World energy consumption: the total energy used by all of human civilization.
 Electrification
 Nuclear fission
 Generation expansion planning
 Distributed generation
 Power station

References

Power engineering
Fossil fuel power stations
 
Infrastructure